HMS Pheasant was an 18-gun merlin class sloop of the Royal Navy.

French Revolutionary Wars

She was built in 1798 for the Royal Navy at a cost of £8,087.

From 1798 to 1803 she was based in Halifax, Nova Scotia.

Napoleonic Wars

In 1805 she was based at the Leeward Island Station. In 1807 she was involved in the Battle of Montevideo (1807) in the Rio de la Plata.

In 1808 she was stationed with the Channel Fleet. On 8 May she captured the French privateer vessel Tropard, formerly . Then on 20 October 1808, Pheasant was in company when  captured and destroyed the French privateer Ponte du Jour.

On 4 November 1809 Pheasant recaptured Traveller.

Later on 3 February 1810, she captured the privateer lugger Comte De Hunebourg from St Malo. Pheasant, under the command of Captain John Palmer, lured the privateer close, with the privateer firing the first shot. The two vessels exchanged fire but it took a four-hour chase before Pheasant was able to make the capture. Comte De Hunebourg, of about 80 tons (bm), had been armed with 14 guns, which she threw overboard during the chase, and had a crew of 53 men. She was three days out of Isle of Bas on her second cruise, but had not yet captured anything.

In October Pheasant recaptured London, of London, which a French privateer had taken. London arrived in Plymouth on 19 October. Pheasant also recaptured Elizabeth, Aiken, master, which had been captured while sailing from Lisbon to Bristol. She arrived in Plymouth on 19 September.

On 17 June 1811, Pheasant captured Héros.

Later in 1812 Pheasant was repaired and refitted in Plymouth at a cost of £11,587.. As soon as she was seaworthy, she was back in action and on 14 December 1812 captured the American schooner Hope.

On 12 March 1813, Pheasant and  captured the schooner William, a U.S. privateer. After a chase of over 100 miles, the British vessels captured the American 8-gun brig Fox, which threw two of her guns overboard during the chase. Fox and her 29-man crew was underway from Bordeaux to Philadelphia.

Post-war

From 1814 to 1818 Pheasant was based in the Channel Fleet. In 1819 she joined the Africa Station patrols off the coast of Africa near Sierra Leone. On 30 July she detained the Portuguese slave trader Nova Felicidade. On 6 October she stopped the Portuguese slave trader Vulcano. There were several deaths of crew due to an outbreak of yellow fever.

Commanders
Henry Carew 1800-1804
Robert Paul 1804-1805
Robert Henderson 1805-1806
John Palmer 1806-1814
Edmund Waller 1814-1818
Benedictus Marwood Kelly 1818-1819
Douglas Clavering 1821-1823

Fate

She was sold on 11 July 1827 for £1,250. to John Small Sedger, Rotherhithe for breaking.

An image of HMS Pheasant appears on a 10p postage stamp of the Ascension Islands.

Citations

References

External links
Ships of the Old Navy A history of the sailing ships of the Royal Navy by Michael Phillips

1798 ships
Sloops of the Royal Navy